Cape Sorell is a headland located in the Southern Ocean outside Macquarie Harbour on the West Coast of Tasmania, Australia. The cape and the Cape Sorell Lighthouse, located above the headland, are important orientation points for all vessels entering the Macquarie Heads and then through Hells Gates at the entrance to the harbour.

Cape Sorrell is named in honour of William Sorell, Lieutenant-Governor of Tasmania from 1817 to 1824.

It is a regularly cited feature of the west coast of Tasmania - for many systems as an indicator the northernmost point of the region South West Tasmania.

Lighthouse
Constructed in 1899 during the rise of the West Coast mining boom, the Cape Sorell Lighthouse is a heritage-listed lighthouse located on Cape Sorell. The lighthouse is located approximately 12 kilometres (7.5 mi) southwest of Strahan.

Macquarie Heads breakwater railway 
Between 1900 and 1946 a horse drawn wooden rail tramline was used to provide access between the Cape Sorell headland and the Cape Sorell Lighthouse and the jetty and wharf locations. It was used to move rock from quarries for the construction and maintenance of the Macquarie Heads breakwater.

Waverider Buoy

See also

 Geography of Tasmania

References

External links 
 Cape Sorell climate history

 
Western Tasmania
Sorell